Kenneth Allan Phelps (born August 6, 1954) is an American former professional baseball designated hitter and first baseman. He played for six different Major League Baseball (MLB) teams from 1980 to 1990, primarily with the Seattle Mariners. Baseball statistician Bill James cited Phelps as an example of a player who is unfairly denied a chance to play in the majors, despite compiling strong minor league statistics.

Early years
Born and raised in Seattle, Washington, Phelps graduated from Ingraham High School in north Seattle in 1972. He played a year at Washington State in Pullman under Bobo Brayton, then headed to Mesa Community College, looking for an opportunity to play at Arizona State in Tempe.

In his only season at MCC in 1974, Phelps was named a junior college All-American. He was drafted twice in the first round (January and June drafts) by the New York Yankees and Philadelphia Phillies, respectively. He had previously been drafted by the Atlanta Braves in the eighth round out of high school in 1972.

All this earned Phelps a chance from Coach Jim Brock to play at ASU, where he was named to the College World Series All Star team in 1976, when the Sun Devils lost to rival Arizona after having defeated the Wildcats seven times that season, including a first-round game in Omaha.

Professional career
The left-hitting first baseman was selected by the Kansas City Royals in the fifteenth round of the 1976 baseball amateur draft. The Royals traded him to the Montreal Expos prior to 1982 season for pitcher Grant Jackson. In the American Association in 1982, Phelps hit .333 with 46 home runs and 141 RBI for the Wichita Aeros. He had only eight major league at-bats that year, as there was no room on a very talented Montreal roster for Phelps to break in. Instead, Phelps' hometown club, Seattle, purchased him from the Expos after the 1982 season.

Seattle
An average defensive player, Phelps was better suited to play with Seattle in the American League, as he could serve as the designated hitter, and the struggling franchise also had plenty of room for advancement.  Phelps split time in 1983 between Seattle and its Pacific Coast League affiliate in Salt Lake City. Again, he hit minor league pitching well (.341 with 24 home runs and 82 RBI in 74 games), but he did not play much in the majors.  In 1984, he played a bit more for Seattle, hitting 24 home runs in only 290 at-bats. Bad luck intervened early that year when a pitch broke his hand in the third game of the season; he had won the regular first base job, and hit two home runs in his first three-game and had five hits in his first ten at-bats. The injury resulted in the call-up of first baseman Alvin Davis after just one game in Triple-A, who immediately produced; Davis was named to the American League All-Star team and was the league's Rookie of the Year.

In 1986 at the age 31, Phelps got into the major league lineup on a more-or-less regular basis.  Although he was normally platooned against left-handed pitchers, Phelps still clocked 51 home runs from   It was at this time that his career travails inspired author Bill James to create the "Ken Phelps All-Star" team.  As James described it:

Ken Phelpses are just available; if you want one, all you have to do is ask.  They are players whose real limitations are exaggerated by baseball insiders, players who get stuck with a label -- the label of their limits, the label the things they can't do -- while those that they can do are overlooked... The Ken Phelps All-Stars [are] a whole teamful of guys who are wearing labels, but who nonetheless can play major-league baseball, and will prove it if they ever get the chance.

The Buhner trade
Phelps hit 14 more home runs for Seattle in the first half of 1988.  Impressed, owner George Steinbrenner of the New York Yankees traded Triple-A prospect Jay Buhner to Seattle in exchange for Phelps, despite already having Don Mattingly and Jack Clark to play first base and DH.  With limited playing time, Phelps found it difficult to maintain his production of the previous four-and-a-half seasons, while Buhner went on to become an All-Star and legendary Mariners player.  A Seinfeld episode in early 1996 ("The Caddy") depicted Yankee fan Frank Costanza (played by Jerry Stiller) as more upset about the Buhner trade than about the supposed death of his own son   Phelps only hit 17 home runs for the Yankees before being traded to the Oakland Athletics in late August 1989.  The A's won the World Series, but Phelps had just two at-bats in the post-season, with a pinch-hit double in the third game of the league championship series.

Final homer
Phelps' final home run might have been his most notable; it came with Oakland before a sell-out home crowd in 1990 on April 20, with two outs in the bottom of the ninth that Friday night. Phelps was called out of the dugout to pinch hit against Brian Holman of the Mariners, who had retired the first 26 batters in succession; he homered on the first pitch to ruin the perfect game.

Years later, Phelps said he wanted to hit it out because he did not want to watch himself on ESPN's SportsCenter all season making the out to complete Holman's gem. He was traded to Cleveland in mid-June, and retired after playing 7 games for the Giants AAA affiliate in Phoenix the next season in 1991 at the age of 36.

Summary
Phelps' career .239 batting average hides the things that, as James pointed out, he could do.  Thanks to outstanding power and strike zone judgment, his career OPS is a strong .854.  Phelps hit 123 home runs in 1854 career at-bats, the 28th best ratio in major league history through 2004 (min. 1500 plate appearances). Phelps hit his first 100 home runs in 1322 at-bats — the second fastest, as measured by at bats, in MLB history, behind Ryan Howard in 1141 at-bats; Phelps still holds the AL record.

After baseball
As of 2005, Phelps did color commentary on the radio for Arizona Diamondbacks baseball games. In 2006, Phelps was replaced as the Diamondbacks color analyst by former Major League pitcher Tom Candiotti. Today, he does baseball analysis for Fox Sports Arizona, along with community and media work he does for the state's largest electric utility, Arizona Public Service. Programs that Phelps has been involved with (The ABC's of Baseball, and Life and Power Players) have received national recognition for having positive impact on children.

Notes

References

External links

Venezuelan Professional Baseball League

1954 births
Living people
American Association (1902–1997) MVP Award winners
American expatriate baseball players in Canada
Arizona Diamondbacks announcers
Arizona State Sun Devils baseball players
Baseball players from Seattle
Cleveland Indians players
Daytona Beach Islanders players
Gulf Coast Royals players
Jacksonville Suns players
Kansas City Royals players
Leones del Caracas players
American expatriate baseball players in Venezuela
Major League Baseball designated hitters
Major League Baseball first basemen
Mesa Thunderbirds baseball players
Montreal Expos players
New York Yankees players
Oakland Athletics players
Omaha Royals players
Phoenix Firebirds players
Salt Lake City Gulls players
Seattle Mariners players
Waterloo Royals players
Wichita Aeros players
Anchorage Glacier Pilots players
Alaska Goldpanners of Fairbanks players